Mohamed Khemisti (born 11 August 1930; died 5 May 1963) was an Algerian politician. He was Minister of Foreign Affairs of Algeria for nine months, from 1962 prior to his assassination in 1963. He was married to Fatima Khemisti—instrumental in the enactment of the Khemisti Law, which raised the minimum age of marriage in Algeria to 16 for women and 18 for men.

He also had been the general secretary of UGEMA (the General Union of Muslim Algerian Students, in French Union Générale des Etudiants Musulmans Algériens) and was imprisoned by the French on 12 November 1957.

References

External links

 

1930 births
Foreign ministers of Algeria
Members of the National Liberation Front (Algeria)
Algerian Muslims
Government ministers of Algeria
1963 deaths
People from Maghnia
20th-century Algerian politicians